Sri Lanka competed at the 2000 Summer Olympics in Sydney, Australia.  The nation won its first Olympic medal since 1948. Sri Lanka has sent their ever largest number of competitors (18) for an Olympic game in this event.

Medalists

Athletics

 Sugath Thilakaratne
Men's 400m
 Round 1 – 45.48
 Round 2 – 45.54 (did not advance)

 Rohan Pradeep Kumar
 Round 1 – 46 (did not advance)

 Arijan Raja Ratnayake
Men's 400m Hurdles
 Round 1 – 50.43 (did not advance)

 Ratna Kumar, Rohan Pradeep Kumar, Lanka Perera Manura, Sugath Thilakaratne, Ranga Wimalawansa
Men's 4x400m
 Round 1 – 03:06.25
 Semifinal – 03:02.89 (did not advance)

 Sarath Prasanna Gamage
Men's Marathon
 Final – 2:34:39 (73rd place)

 Susanthika Jayasinghe
Women's 100m
 Round 1 – 11.15
 Round 2 – 11.23
 Semifinal – 11.33 (did not advance)

Women's 200m
 Round 1 – 22.53
 Round 2 – 22.54
 Semifinal – 22.45
 Final – 22.28 (Silver medal)

 Damayanthi Darsha
Women's 400m
 Round 1 – 52.13
 Round 2 – 52.35 (did not advance)

 Sriyani Kulawansa Fonseka
Women's 100m Hurdles
 Round 1 – 13.10
 Round 2 – 13.19 (did not advance)

 Damayanthi Darsha, Nimmi De Zoysa, Tamara Saman Deepika, Kumari Herath Pradeepa
Women's 4x100m
 Round 1 – 44.51 (did not advance)

Sailing

 Lalin Jirasinha
Men's Single Handed Dinghy (Finn)
 Race 1 – 23 
 Race 2 – 25 
 Race 3 – 25 
 Race 4 – (26) RET
 Race 5 – (26) DNC
 Race 6 – (26) DNC
 Race 7 – (26) DNC
 Race 8 – (26) DNC
 Race 9 – (26) DNC
 Race 10 – 25 
 Race 11 – 22 
 Final – 224 (25th place)

Shooting

Ruwani Abeymanne
Malini Wickramasinghe

Swimming

 Conrad Francis
Men's 100m Butterfly
 Preliminary Heat – 57.44 (did not advance)

 Theekshana Ratnasekera
Women's 50m Freestyle
 Preliminary Heat – 29.88 (did not advance)

References
Wallechinsky, David (2004). The Complete Book of the Summer Olympics (Athens 2004 Edition). Toronto, Canada. . 
International Olympic Committee (2001). The Results. Retrieved 12 November 2005.
Sydney Organising Committee for the Olympic Games (2001). Official Report of the XXVII Olympiad Volume 1: Preparing for the Games. Retrieved 20 November 2005.
Sydney Organising Committee for the Olympic Games (2001). Official Report of the XXVII Olympiad Volume 2: Celebrating the Games. Retrieved 20 November 2005.
Sydney Organising Committee for the Olympic Games (2001). The Results. Retrieved 20 November 2005.
International Olympic Committee Web Site
Sri Lanka at the 2000 Sydney Summer Games

Nations at the 2000 Summer Olympics
2000
2000 in Sri Lankan sport